In the United States, Adult Protective Services (APS) are social services provided to abused, neglected, or exploited older adults and adults with significant disabilities.  APS is typically administered by local or state health, aging, or regulatory departments and includes a multidisciplinary approach to helping older adults, and younger adults with disabilities, who are victims. Services range from the initial investigation of mistreatment, to health and supportive services and legal interventions, up to and including the appointment of surrogate decision-makers such as legal guardians.  

While some states provide adult protective services to older adults only, as in Ohio where the APS law applies to those 60 and older, most serve adults with disabilities over the age of 18 who meet the state's definition of "vulnerable". Disabilities may be due to aging, developmental disabilities, physical disabilities, mental illness or cognitive impairments.

Forms of abuse include physical, emotional, verbal, and sexual abuse as well as financial exploitation. "Neglect" can be perpetrated by any caregiver who has accepted the responsibility of assisting an older person or an adult with disabilities.

Most states include self-neglect in their definitions of those needing adult protective services. Self-neglect refers to a person who is unable to care for themselves due to physical or cognitive impairments.

See also 
 Vulnerable adult
 Safeguarding

References

Further reading
 National Adult Protective Services Resource Center, 2012. "Adult Protective Services in 2012: Increasingly Vulnerable."
 Este, Stephen, 2007. "The Challenges of Accountability in the Human Services: Performance Management in the Adult Protective Services Program of Texas" (2007). Applied Research Projects. Texas State University Paper 250.
 Wold, Kezeli, 2010. "Adult Protective Services Specialists in Texas: Perceptions of Three Factors Affecting Turnover".  Applied Research Projects. Texas State University Paper 328.

External links 
National Adult Protective Services Association
National Center on Elder Abuse
International Network for the Prevention of Elder Abuse
 Adult Protective Service Association of Ontario
 Senior Abuse Awareness and Prevention

Social care in the United States
Vulnerable adults